Siv Sokole (English: "Grey Falcon") is album of traditional Serbian songs by “Pjevačka družina Svetlane Spajić” (Singing Company of Svetlana Spajić). It was published as a CD by Belgrade publisher “Multimedia Music” in 2012.

On the album are published 21 oldest form songs of Serbian traditional singing — including “ojkalice” (the loud folk songs) from Dalmatia, “potresalice” (wedding shaking songs) from Bosanska Krajina, „ganga” from Herzegovina, “kajda” from Zlatibor, “kantalice” from Podrinje and ancient ballads from Kosovo and Metohija and Eastern Serbia — performed by Svetlana Spajić, Dragana Tomić, Minja Nikolić, Jovana Lukić and Zorana Bantić.

Being an important cultural event, an all evening concert from Radio Belgrade's Studio 6, which promoted the album on March 27, 2013, was broadcast live by the Third Program of Radio Belgrade and TV channel RTS Digital.

This edition was pronounced the best world music album in Serbia for 2012, by the choice of the “Disco 3000” show of Radio B92.

Track listing 
 Golubice bjela
 Siv sokole
 Četiri gange
 Prioni, mobo, za lada
 Polegla je belija pšenica
 Oj, jabuko zeleniko
 Valila se vala
 Kukaj, kukaj, crna kukavice
 Ova brda i puste doline
 Što Morava mutna teče
 Sine mio, gde si sinoć bio
 Ja urani jutros rano
 Što me iska svaka neprilika
 Zakošena zelena livada
 Oženi se od donjega grada
 Udaću se đe ću biti sama
 Karanfil se na put sprema
 Robstvo Janković Stevana
 Oj Krajino, moja mila mati
 Kićeno nebo zvezdama
 Bjela Golubica

Critical reception

Awards and prizes 
 Best world music album in Serbia for 2012. by the choice of the “Disco 3000” show of Radio B92.

References

External links 
  „Svetlana Spajić, pevačica tradicionalnih pesama: Težnja ka savršenoj harmoniji“, interview by Sonja Ćirić, Vreme, Belgrade, Nr. 1152, January 31, 2013. 

2012 albums
Svetlana Spajić albums